Çabër or Čabra is a village located in the municipality of Zubin Potok, in Kosovo. The river Ibar runs through Çabër.

History
According to legend, there were two brothers and their nephew who came to Çabër first and gave it its name. Eventually a village was formed and grew to have a large population. The brothers and their nephew allegedly came from Qafë Prush, which is located on the border of Kosovo (Gjakova) and Albania. The most common surnames in the village are Uka, Kurti, and Mehmeti.

Notes

References

Villages in Zubin Potok